Deeds of Flesh is an American brutal death metal band from Los Osos, California, U.S. They were formed in 1993 by Jacoby Kingston, Erik Lindmark (1972–2018) and Joey Heaslet, and remained active until Lindmark's death in 2018.  They founded their own label, Unique Leader Records, which has since become home to a number of other death metal bands from around the world.  Deeds of Flesh have released nine studio albums, their most recent being Nucleus which was released in 2020.

Overview

Brief history
Deeds of Flesh formed in 1993. They signed to Wild Rags Records and released their first EP, entitled Gradually Melted. They then moved labels to the now-defunct Repulse Records, and released their first full-length album, entitled Trading Pieces, in 1996.

Two years later, in 1998, they released a second album, entitled Inbreeding the Anthropophagi, on the same label, this time with Brad Palmer replacing Joey Heaslet on drums.  After this album was recorded, guitarist Jim Tkacz joined the band. The band then lost their contract with the label and self-released a demo. After this, they decided to form their own label Unique Leader Records. All their subsequent records were released on this label. The band then released a DVD called Deeds of Flesh: Live In Montreal in 2005.

In 2007, founding member and bassist Jacoby Kingston announced he was leaving the band, due to lifestyle changes.  He was replaced by Erlend Caspersen.

In Summer 2012, Erik Lindmark was diagnosed with tendonitis, leading to a touring hiatus. The band's eighth full-length, Portals to Canaan was released on June 25, 2013.

On November 29, 2018, frontman Erik Lindmark died from sclerosis at the age of 46.

On September 28, 2020, the band announced a new album, Nucleus, which would be released on December 11. It is the band's first album without frontman Erik Lindmark, though it features music Lindmark wrote and recorded prior to his death. It was also announced that former bassist and vocalist Jacoby Kingston had ended his retirement and rejoined the band solely as vocalist, while former drummer Mike Hamilton also contributed to the album. In addition, the album features guest vocals from many established death metal vocalists, including Luc Lemay of Gorguts, John Gallagher of Dying Fetus, George "Corpsegrinder" Fisher of Cannibal Corpse, Frank Mullen of Suffocation, Matti Way of Disgorge, Bill Robinson of Decrepit Birth, Anthony Trapani of Odious Mortem, Obie Flett of Pathology, Robbe Kok of Disavowed, Dusty Boisjolie of Severed Savior, and Jon Zig of Serpentian.

Tours
Deeds of Flesh has toured extensively over the past decade.  After the release of Mark of the Legion, the band supported Monstrosity on the "Bloodletting North America Pt. II" Tour.  A year later, in 2002, they would tour with Disgorge  and Dutch death metallers Severe Torture and Disavowed on the Bloodletting North America Part III tour.  The band also performed a number of shows with Cannibal Corpse.

2004 found the band touring with such widely known American death metal acts as Dying Fetus and Hate Eternal.  They also toured Australia with Tasmanian death metal group Psycroptic.

After sitting out much of 2005 due to injuries to Jacoby Kingston and Mike Hamilton, the band started touring again in 2006.  They toured Europe alongside Monstrosity, Vile, and Impaled, then toured North America with Decrepit Birth, Vile, and Odious Mortem.

Musical style
Their music can be described as influenced by the brutal death metal style pioneered by Suffocation and the technical approach of bands like Morbid Angel and Cannibal Corpse coupled with a songwriting style that incorporates numerous abrupt changes in meter and tempo, creating a disorienting atmosphere to the listener. The guitar riffs themselves tend to be atonal, albeit often minor or diminished, mixtures of palm-muting, fast tremolo picking, and breakdowns. The drum parts also change frequently, mirroring the constantly shifting nature of the guitar lines. The vocals are a mixture of low growls and high screams. On former albums, the low-pitched vocals were performed by Lindmark, and the high-pitched vocals by Kingston. After Kingston's departure, Lindmark undertook all vocal duties before his death on November 29, 2018.

Deeds of Flesh did not implement guitar solos until their 2008 release Of What's to Come, on which there are many, performed by then-new guitarist Sean Southern.

Their lyrical content deals with themes common to death metal, such as death, murder, disease, and horror. Of What's To Come was a stylistic departure from this as a concept album that dealt with post-apocalyptic and science fiction themes.

Members

Current members
 Jacoby Kingston – vocals , bass 
 Mike Hamilton – drums 
 Craig Peters – guitars 
 Ivan Munguia – guitars , bass

Former members
 Erik Lindmark – vocals, guitars 
 Joey Heaslet – drums 
 Brad Palmer – drums 
 Roderick Williams Jr. – guitars 
 Derek Boyer – bass 
 Jimmy Tkacz – guitars 
 Jared Deaver – guitars 
 Sean Southern – guitars 
 Erlend Caspersen – bass 
 Corey Athos – vocals 
 Darren Cecsa – drums

Timeline

Discography
Trading Pieces (1996)
Inbreeding the Anthropophagi (1998)
Path of the Weakening (1999)
Mark of the Legion (2001)
Reduced to Ashes (2003)
Crown of Souls (2005)
Of What's to Come (2008)
Portals to Canaan (2013)
Nucleus (2020)

References

External links
 MySpace Profile
 [ Deeds of Flesh profile] on Allmusic

Musical groups established in 1993
Death metal musical groups from California
1993 establishments in California